Yaakov Hagoel (born February 19, 1971) (Hebrew: יעקב חגואל), is the Chairman of the Executive of the World Zionist Organization. He was formerly acting chairman of The Jewish Agency for Israel. 

Between 2015 - 2020 Hagoel served as the Vice Chairman of the WZO. He was also the Head of the WZO's Department of Activities in Israel and Countering Antisemitism.

Vice Chairman of the World Zionist Organization
Hagoel was elected to the position of Vice Chairman of the World Zionist Organization at the 37th Zionist Congress in October, 2015. Hagoel was elected to the position of the WZO's Department for Activities in Israel & Countering Antisemitism in 2010. He founded the Center for Countering Antisemitism at the World Zionist Organization. In this capacity, he has chaired meetings, lectures and conferences in the field of countering Antisemitism, frequently speaking out against incidents. In his capacity as Vice-Chairman, Hagoel has worked closely with the American Zionist Movement, the Zionist Federation of Great Britain and organizations around the world on issues of anti-Israel bias and Judeo-phobia. In 2018, he co-chaired a conference in the US in the wake of the deadly shooting at a Pittsburgh synagogue. In August 2020, Hagoel, together with Member of Knesset David Bitan, met with representatives of Facebook, Twitter and YouTube to establish a team to handle the rise of Antisemitic content in social media.

In September 2020, Hagoel was listed as one of the world's most influential Jews by the Jerusalem Post.

Biography
Hagoel was born in 1971 in Tel Aviv. Before serving in the Israel Defense Forces, he volunteered for a year in the southern city of Ofakim. During his military service, he served in the Nahal unit. Following his regular service, he joined the army reserves in the Gaza Division. He studied law at the Ono Academic College and earned an LL.B.  career

Hagoel joined the ranks of the Betar youth movement at a young age, eventually becoming the treasurer and later the Executive CEO of World Betar. He served as chairman of the Council of World Zionist Youth Movements, presidium member of the Zionist Executive Committee, member of the WZO Finance Committee and executive CEO of the World Leadership of the Betar Movement. He has been a member of the Board of Trustees of the Jewish Agency since 2010. Additionally, Hagoel serves as co-chair of the Task Force on Countering Antisemitism of the Jewish Agency's Board of Trustees, a member of the Board of Governors of Keren Hayesod—United Israel Appeal, and a member of the Herzl Council and the Jabostinky's Council of the Israeli Prime Minister's Office. He also serves as a member of Executive Committee of the Ariel University. In 2011 Hagoel was elected to serve as a member of the Yad Vashem Council. Hagoel was Chairman of World Likud from 2015 - 2020 and elected Vice Chairman of the World Zionist Organization during the World Zionist Congress that took place in Jerusalem. On August 11th 2022, the 14th of Av 5782, Yaakov Hagoel was appointed as a member of the National Council for Planning and Construction and a member of the Subcommittee for Principled Planning. On July 7, 2021, Hagoel was elected by the Jewish Agency's management to serve as acting chairman of the Jewish Agency. Hagoel replaced Isaac Herzog who previously served as the chairman until he was elected to be the President of Israel. Haguel served in this position until Doron Almog took office on August 21, 2022.

Hagoel lives in Netanya and is married to Tehiya with four children.
In July 2017, Hagoel led and initiated the Benyamin Ze'ev Herzl Law in the Knesset. This amendment to the Herzl Law pass in both a penultimate and final vote, according to which, the State will participate in funding the WZO's ongoing activities at the Herzl Museum and the Midrasha, along with any costs related to the continued maintenance and training obligations of both the Museum and Midrasha.

References

External links
 Yaakov Hagoel on the WZO's iZionist site
 Yaakov Hagoel on WZO main site

News Items
Yaakov Hagoel elected chairman of WZO executive | The Jerusalem Post | 22 October 2020
Understanding the lessons of the Holocaust | The Jerusalem Post | 21 January 2020
In many ways, Herzl reminds us of Moses | The Jerusalem Post | 24 July 2019
Throughout history, no other people has held so strongly to the memory of their homeland | The Jerusalem Post | 16 October 2018
Ze’ev Jabotinsky, his legacy and importance in Zionism |The Jerusalem Post | 11 July 2018
Giro d’Italia, Mahmoud Abbas and Jerusalem The Jerusalem Post | 6 May 2018
Poll: 85% of Jews worldwide experienced or saw anti-Semitism. Israel Hayom | 13 January 2017
Herzog and Edelstein agree: Not all criticism of Israel is antisemitism. Jerusalem Post | 16 January 2017
Stabbing part of growing global trend of anti-Semitic violence, says Hagoel. Haaretz / Associated Press
Response to Call for French Jews to hide kippot. Jerusalem Post
Yaakov Hagoel  warns of increased anti-Semitism throughout Europe Israel National News
The Israeli Mission to the United Nations and the AJC hosted "The Battle for Zionism" Jewish Journal
The Jews are easy prey for the hatred and incitement YNET News
Zionist Anti BDS Conference Israel National News
Nike's World Cup Video Slammed as Anti-Semitic Israel National News
Yaakov Hagoel interview on Israel Channel 10 (Hebrew)

1971 births
Israeli chief executives
Living people
Jewish Agency for Israel
Ono Academic College alumni
Zionist organizations
Betar members